Night Light is the title of a 1985 studio album by 2nd Chapter of Acts.

Track listing 
From discogs.com and AllMusic.

All songs written by Annie Herring, except where noted.
 "Night Light" – 3:29
 "Heartstrings" – 3:37
 "Oh No! Can't Believe It!" (Annie Herring, Buck Herring) – 4:25
 "He Will Rule" – 4:28
 "Consider the Lilies" – 3:14
 "He's the Light" (Annie Herring, Matthew Ward) – 4:04
 "Oh Boy!" – 3:16
 "What to Do with My Heart" – 3:43
 "That's Not Nice to Say" (Annie Herring, Buck Herring, Matthew Ward) – 5:07
 "Jesus Will be Right Back" – 3:30

Personnel 
2nd Chapter of Acts
 Annie Herring – vocals, acoustic piano, vocal arrangements
 Nelly Ward – vocals, vocal arrangements
 Matthew Ward – vocals, vocal arrangements, arrangements (1–7, 9, 10)

Musicians
 Jim Tenneboe – synthesizers (1, 2, 4–7, 9), acoustic piano (4, 5)
 Kerry Livgren – synthesizers (3, 10), guitars (3, 10), arrangements
 Michael Omartian – acoustic piano (8), synthesizers (8), arrangements (8)
 Si Simonson – acoustic piano (10)
 Curt Bartlett – guitars (1, 2, 4–7, 9)
 John Scudder – bass (1, 2, 4–7, 9)
 Leland Sklar – bass (3, 10)
 Jack Kelly – drums (1, 2, 3, 5, 7–10)
 Michael Celenza – drums (4, 6), percussion (4, 6)
 Sherman Trivette – saxophone (2)
 Jimmy Owens – string arrangements (1, 5)

Kerry Livgren was not part of the band but appeared as a courtesy from CBS Records.

Production 
 Buck Herring – producer, engineer, mixing
 Wally Dugid – engineer
 Greg Hunt – mixing
 Constance Ashley – photography

References

2nd Chapter of Acts albums
1985 albums